Amerila fuscivena is a moth of the subfamily Arctiinae. It was described by George Hampson in 1916. It is found in Uganda.

The larvae feed on Landolphia species.

References

Endemic fauna of Uganda
Moths described in 1916
Amerilini
Insects of Uganda
Moths of Africa